Uncisudis advena is a species of barracudinas. It is found in the Western Central Atlantic Ocean, from the  eastern Gulf of Mexico and off the east coast of Florida.

Size

References 

Paralepididae
Taxa named by Robert Rees Rofen
Fish described in 1963